Auguste-Louis-Armand-Loiseleur Deslongchamps (or ALA Loiseleur-Deslongchamps) (14 August 1805 – 10 January 1840) was a French indologist. He was the second son of the botanist, Jean-Louis-Auguste Loiseleur-Deslongchamps. He is known for his translation of the Manusmriti and Amara Sinha's Amara-Kosha.

References

French Indologists
1805 births
1840 deaths